Redecilla may refer to the following places in Spain:

Redecilla del Camino
Redecilla del Campo